In potential theory and optimization, polarization constants (also known as Chebyshev constants) are solutions to a max-min problem for potentials. Originally,  these problems were introduced by a Japanese mathematician Makoto Ohtsuka. Recently these problems got some attention as they can help to generate random points on smooth manifolds (in particular, unit sphere) with prescribed probability density function. The problem of finding the polarization constant is connected to the problem of energy minimization and, in particular to the Thomson problem.

Practical motivation
From the practical point of view, these problems can be used to answer the following question: if  denotes the amount of a substance received at  due to an injector of the substance located
reaches every point of ? For example, one can relate this question to treating tumors with radioactive seeds.

Formal Definition

Classical kernels
The Chebyshev nomenclature for this max-min problem emanates from the case when  is the logarithmic kernel,    for when  is a subset of

References 

Potential theory